The Will to Live is a 1997 album by Ben Harper which showed his continuing folk-centric focus, while at the same time expanding on his rock talents.  This was his third album, his second with the Innocent Criminals (uncredited), and was packaged with a special bonus CD in certain countries.

The record would yield his first UK Top 75 single, Faded. To date it remains his only UK single entry.

Track listing
All songs written by Ben Harper except as noted.
"Faded" – 4:48
"Homeless Child" – 3:51
"Number Three" – 1:43
"Roses from My Friends" – 6:23
"Jah Work" – 4:54
"I Want to Be Ready" – 4:02
"The Will to Live" – 4:57
"Ashes" – 3:52
"Widow of a Living Man" – 4:10
"Glory & Consequence" – 5:40
"Mama's Trippin'" (Harper, Jean-Pierre Plunier) – 3:45
"I Shall Not Walk Alone" – 5:13

Personnel
Ben Harper - guitar, saz, vocals, weissenborn
Louis Allen - bass
Alan Anderson - guitar
Agnes Baddoo - background vocals
Brett Banduci - viola
Patrick Brayer - fiddle
Dean Butterworth - drums
Danielle Charles - violin
Juan Nelson - bass, background vocals
Eric Person - saxophone
Amy Piatt - background vocals
Emily Wright - cello

Production
Producer: J.P. Plunier
Engineer: Todd Burke
Assistant engineers: Peter Doell, Erica Stephenson, Dann Thompson
Mixing: Eric Sarafin
Mastering: Dave Collins
Art direction: J.P. Plunier
Design: Flavia Cureteu
Photography: Annalisa, J.P. Plunier

Charts
Album - Billboard (North America)

Certifications

References

Ben Harper albums
1997 albums
Virgin Records albums